Kammern im Liesingtal is a municipality in the district of Leoben in the Austrian state of Styria.

Geography
Kammern im Liesingtal lies in the Liesing valley in northeast Styria, in the center of upper Styria.

References

Cities and towns in Leoben District